The 1975 All-Ireland Under-21 Hurling Championship was the 12th staging of the All-Ireland Under-21 Hurling Championship since its establishment by the Gaelic Athletic Association in 1964. The championship began on 9 April 1975 and ended on 12 October 1975.

Kilkenny entered the championship as the defending champions.

On 12 October 1975, Kilkenny won the championship following a 5-13 to 2-19 defeat of Cork in the All-Ireland final. This was their second All-Ireland title overall and their second title in succession.

Cork's Éamonn O'Sullivan was the championship's top scorer with 4-09.

Results

Leinster Under-21 Hurling Championship

Quarter-finals

Semi-finals

Final

Munster Under-21 Hurling Championship

First round

Semi-finals

Final

Ulster Under-21 Hurling Championship

Final

All-Ireland Under-21 Hurling Championship

Semi-finals

Final

Championship statistics

Top scorers

Overall

References

Under
All-Ireland Under-21 Hurling Championship